Valley Christian High School (VCHS) is a private Christian high school located in Cerritos, California. It is one of the largest in Los Angeles and Orange Counties. It was founded in 1935 and is part of Valley Christian Schools, a school system with 4 campuses (preschool, elementary, middle and high school) enrolling more than 1300 students.  In 2011, during its accreditation reviews, it received the highest degree of commendation from the Western Association of Schools and Colleges. Valley Christian Schools is a member of Christian Schools International (CSI) and the Association of Christian Schools International (ACSI).

Academics 
97% of VCHS graduates continue on to college. VCHS graduates who are accepted to University of California schools have the highest SAT scores of any Protestant, Catholic, or Lutheran high school in L.A. and Orange County.

In 2013 VCHS students had an 81% pass rate (3 or higher) on AP exams compared to a National average of 58%.

Valley Christian offers 20 AP and Honors courses.

Athletics 
Valley Christian is current a member of the Olympic League of the CIF Southern Section. VCHS teams have won 200 league championships and 30 CIF state titles (and another three state runners-up). In 2011 the soccer team was ranked by USA Today as the #1 team in America. Nearly 60% of students participate in school athletics. The Girls Volleyball team has won a national championship.

Notable alumni 
John Verhoeven (Class of 1971) - Former Major League Baseball pitcher and head baseball coach at Biola University
Greg Laswell (Class of 1992) - musician
Kirk Saarloos (Class of 1997) -  Former Major League Baseball pitcher for the Houston Astros, Oakland A's, and Cincinnati Reds
Arthur Chu (Class of 2002) - Class valedictorian, Jeopardy! contestant in from January 28, 2014 – March 12, 2014. Third-ranked Jeopardy champion of all time both in wins and money won.
Beau Bennett (Class of 2010, transferred out) - National Hockey League forward for the St. Louis Blues.  Highest-drafted Californian born-and-trained player in NHL history, and first California born-and-trained player to become a Stanley Cup Champion (2016).
Troy Van Leeuwen (Class of 1986) - Musician
Crystal Rosenthal (Class of 1996) - Head Softball Coach Concordia University Irvine

References

External links
Valley Christian High School website

Christian schools in California
Private elementary schools in California
Educational institutions established in 1935
High schools in Los Angeles County, California
Private high schools in California
Private middle schools in California
1935 establishments in California